Baramu is a Papuan language of Western Province, Papua New Guinea.

Baramu is spoken in Baramura, Tapila, Tirio, and Tirio 2 villages of Gogodala Rural LLG.

References

Languages of Western Province (Papua New Guinea)
Tirio languages